Legislative elections were held in Mexico on 3 July 1949. The Institutional Revolutionary Party won 142 of the 147 seats in the Chamber of Deputies.

Results

References

Mexico
Legislative
Legislative elections in Mexico
Mexican legislative election
Election and referendum articles with incomplete results